Atal Medical and Research University, commonly known as AMRU and earlier known as Himachal Pradesh University of Health Sciences is a university in Ner Chowk, Mandi, Himachal Pradesh, India. It is first university in the state of Himachal Pradesh to specialise in medicine and health sciences.

Affiliated colleges

Medical Colleges
Dr. Radhakrishnan Government Medical College, Hamirpur
Dr. Rajendra Prasad Government Medical College, Kangra
Dr. Yashwant Singh Parmar Government Medical College, Nahan
Indira Gandhi Medical College, Shimla
Pt. Jawahar Lal Nehru Government Medical College And Hospital, Chamba
Shri Lal Bahadur Shastri Government Medical College, Mandi

Affiliated Nursing colleges

There are 41 nursing colleges affiliated with Atal Medical and research university, mandi.

Affiliated Ayurvedic and Homeopathy colleges

There are 2 Ayurvedic College, 1 Homeopathy, 1 Sowa Rigpa colleges are affiliated with Atal Medical and research university, mandi.

See also
Atal Bihari Vajpayee Medical University

References

Medical and health sciences universities in India
Medical colleges in Himachal Pradesh
Memorials to Atal Bihari Vajpayee
Educational institutions established in 2017
2017 establishments in Himachal Pradesh